Stuart Webster (born 25 October 1978) is a Scottish-Australian footballer who plays for Geelong SC as a goalkeeper

Career
Stuart Webster started his playing career as a left winger, eventually moving into goals when he was 15 years old. Stuart joined the Frankston Pines Soccer Club in 1994 at the age of 16, becoming their player of the year in 1997. With the Pines, Webster achieved promotion from State League 3 in 1998 and State 2 in 1999, once more winning their player of the year award in 1999.

A move overseas in 2000 saw Webster turn out for Tarff Rovers FC and Greenock Morton F.C. between 2000 and 2001. Webster left Morton in 2001 as the club went into administration. He then return to the Pines. With the Pines, Webster won the State League 1 in 2002, picking up their Player of the Year award for the third time. In 2003, Frankston finished runners-up in the Victorian Premier League and Webster collected his fourth Player of the Year award from the club, also being selected as the Victorian Premier League Goalkeeper of the Year in 2003.

Webster left the Pines in 2005 to sign for Oakleigh Cannons. He signed for Richmond SC for the 2007 VPL season.

In November 2007, Webster joined New Zealand's A League team Wellington Phoenix on a one-match deal for the match against Sydney FC. He came into the squad in the absence of Mark Paston and Jacob Spoonley who were away with the All Whites.

In January 2009 he joined Dandenong Thunder from Richmond SC. Together with other Victorian Premier League veterans he helped his team for a fantastic start of the 2009 season as they stay unbeaten after 10 rounds.

In 2014 Webster moved to St Albans Saints and kept in their first FFA Cup tie against Parramatta FC. He left St Albans at the end of the 2015 NPL1 season and signed for State League 2 North-West side Geelong SC, managed by close friends Steve Laurie and Toby Paterson.

References

External links

1978 births
Living people
Footballers from Ayr
Scottish footballers
Association football goalkeepers
A-League Men players
Scottish Football League players
Greenock Morton F.C. players
Wellington Phoenix FC players
Dandenong Thunder SC players
Scottish expatriate footballers
Expatriate soccer players in Australia
Scottish expatriate sportspeople in Australia